The Men's relay of the Biathlon World Championships 2011 was held on March 11, 2011 at 14:00. Twenty-six nations participated.

Results

References

Biathlon World Championships 2011